The 1989–90 season was the 44th season in Rijeka's history and their 28th season in the Yugoslav First League. Their 10th place finish in the 1988–89 season meant it was their 16th successive season playing in the Yugoslav First League.

Competitions

Yugoslav First League

Classification

Results summary

Results by round

Matches

First League

Source: rsssf.com

Yugoslav Cup

Source: rsssf.com

Squad statistics
Competitive matches only.  Appearances in brackets indicate numbers of times the player came on as a substitute.

Notes
1. Data for league attendance in most cases reflects the number of sold tickets and may not be indicative of the actual attendance.

See also
1989–90 Yugoslav First League
1989–90 Yugoslav Cup

References

External links
 1989–90 Yugoslav First League at rsssf.com
 Prvenstvo 1989.-90. at nk-rijeka.hr

HNK Rijeka seasons
Rijeka